Arthur Schutt (November 21, 1902 – January 28, 1965) was an American jazz pianist and arranger.

Schutt was born in Reading, Pennsylvania, United States, and learned piano from his father. He accompanied silent films as a teenager in the 1910 and was playing in a movie palace in 1918 when Paul Specht hired him to play in a band; he worked for Specht until 1924, including during a tour of Europe in 1923. He held positions with Roger Wolfe Kahn and Don Voorhees, and became a prolific studio pianist, recording with Fred Rich, Nat Shilkret, Frankie Trumbauer, Bix Beiderbecke, and the Charleston Chasers. From 1926-29 and again in 1931 he played with Red Nichols; he also recorded with Jimmy and Tommy Dorsey's orchestra (1928–31), and Benny Goodman. He recorded under his own name in 1929-30 as a bandleader.

Schutt receded from jazz in the 1930s, though he did play with Bud Freeman in 1939. He spent much of the 1940s and 1950s working in the Hollywood recording studios.

Schutt composed a jazz tune "Delirium" in 1927, which was widely recorded.  In 1934, Schutt co-wrote "Georgia Jubilee" with Benny Goodman which, while a hit, was also recorded by Isham Jones's band. Schutt also composed the ragtime "piano novelty" piece "Bluin' the Black Keys", considered one of the most difficult traditional, period rags ever written.

Schutt died in San Francisco, California, in January 1965, at the age of 62.

See also
List of ragtime composers

References
Footnotes

General references
Scott Yanow, [ Arthur Schutt] at AllMusic

External links
Arthur Schutt recordings at the Discography of American Historical Recordings

1902 births
1965 deaths
American jazz pianists
American male pianists
Musicians from Reading, Pennsylvania
Ragtime composers
20th-century American composers
20th-century American pianists
Jazz musicians from Pennsylvania
20th-century American male musicians
American male jazz musicians
The Dorsey Brothers members
The Charleston Chasers members